Passive Me, Aggressive You (stylised as Passive Me • Aggressive You) is the debut studio album by New Zealand indie electronic band The Naked and Famous. It was released on 6 September 2010 by Somewhat Damaged. The album debuted at number one on the New Zealand Albums Chart. The album spawned four singles: "All of This", "Young Blood", "Punching in a Dream" and "Girls Like You"; with "Young Blood" peaking at number one on the New Zealand Singles Chart.

Composition
Passive Me, Aggressive You is a synth-pop and electro-rock album, drawing from the genres of dance-rock, and featuring post-punk influences. "Young Blood" is a synth-pop song, while "Punching in a Dream" is of the dream pop genre. "Spank" is psychedelic rock.

Singles
The first single from Passive Me, Aggressive You, "All of This", was released on 16 November 2009, almost a year prior to the album's release.

"Young Blood" was released as the album's second single on 7 July 2010, debuting at number one on the New Zealand Singles Chart and spending two consecutive weeks atop the chart.

"Punching in a Dream" was released as the third single on 23 August 2010, reaching number 11 in New Zealand.

The album's fourth and final single, "Girls Like You", was released on 5 June 2011.

Critical reception

Chris Schulz from Stuff.co.nz awarded Passive Me, Aggressive You five out of five stars, and praised its production and variety of musical styles. AllMusic's Matt Collar praised the songs' catchy choruses and, awarding the album four-and-a-half out of five stars, concluded, "there's nothing passive about how much you could aggressively love this band". Scott Kara of The New Zealand Herald rated Passive Me, Aggressive You a perfect five stars, summarising "Forget the hype. It's real". The Nelson Mail Nick Ward called Passive Me, Aggressive You "Unconvincing, but with flashes of promise". Writing for NME, Mark Baumont described the album as "a glorious melting pot of pop perfection" and added "TN&F’s passive melodicism and aggressive innovation clash in a dazzling blaze of psych/sonic fireworks." The album was nominated for the 2011 Taite Music Prize.Commercial performance
The album debuted at number one on the New Zealand Albums Chart on 13 September 2010, and was knocked off the top spot by Linkin Park's A Thousand Suns the following week.

Track listing

Personnel
Credits adapted from the liner notes of Passive Me, Aggressive You''.

The Naked and Famous
 Aaron Short
 Alisa Xayalith
 David Beadle
 Jesse Wood
 Thom Powers

Technical
 Thom Powers – production, engineering
 Aaron Short – production, engineering
 Olly Harmer – additional engineering
 Billy Bush – mixing
 Emily Lazar – mastering
 Joe LaPorta – mastering

Artwork
 Special Problems – artwork, design, video

Charts

Weekly charts

Year-end charts

Certifications

Release history

See also
 List of number-one albums in 2010 (New Zealand)

References

2010 debut albums
Fiction Records albums
The Naked and Famous albums
Universal Republic Records albums